Max Sopacua (2 March 1946 – 17 November 2021) was an Indonesian sportscaster and politician. A member of the Democratic Party, he served in the People's Representative Council from 2004 to 2014.

References

1946 births
2021 deaths
Indonesian politicians
Democratic Party (Indonesia) politicians
People from Ambon, Maluku
Members of the People's Representative Council, 2004
Members of the People's Representative Council, 2009